Live in Concert 2010 is the second live album by the Danish power rock band Dizzy Mizz Lizzy. Recorded at the K.B. Hallen on 16–17 April 2010, it documents the band's finale of their 2010 reunion tour. Performing at this venue has a special connotation to the band members, who grew up nearby and saw concerts of their musical heroes growing up. The original building was destroyed by a fire 1.5 years later. The album was released on 8 November 2010 as 2CD/DVD and 2CD/Blu-ray. In Japan, it was released on 27 April on King Records. and includes a sticker sheet and liner notes by Masa Ito.

Part of the release is the 80-minute documentary Lost Inside a Dream: The Story of Dizzy Mizz Lizzy, which premiered at the Copenhagen International Documentary Festival (CPH:DOX) on 4 November 2010, where it won the Politiken Publikumspris (people's choice award). It features footage from Dizzy Mizz Lizzy shows from the 1980s and 1990s, home videos, events revolving around the band's reunion in 2009 and the ensuing 2010 tour, and individual interviews with the band members. The documentary's title is the first line to the lyrics of the band's song "Barbedwired Baby's Dream". It is dedicated to Lars Overgaard who engineered, mixed and mastered both of Dizzy Mizz Lizzy's studio albums, and co-produced both their compilations. He died on 7 August 2010. Both the concert and the documentary have been directed by the Danish film maker Theis Molin.

Track listing

Personnel 

Dizzy Mizz Lizzy
 Tim Christensen – guitar, vocals, songwriter
 Martin Nielsen – bass
 Søren Friis – drums
Post-production
 Theis Molin – director, producer
 Jesper Kodahl Andersen – editor, online/grading
 Rune Nissen-Petersen – mixer, live sound mix
 Nikolaj Vinten – mastering
 Peter Schiøtz – audio post production
 Paul Wilson – graphic design, artwork
Recording
 Jan Pallesen – director of photography
 Lars Bonde – photographer
 Martin Top – photographer
 Dror Kasinsky – photographer
 Thomas Gerhardt – photographer
 Christoffer Dines Dreyer – photographer
 Bo Dalum – photographer
 Ian Hansen – photographer
 Claus Mølbæk – teko / Robocam
 Martin Østervang – assistant teko
 Simon Hilden – camera assistant
 Jimmy Leavens – grip
 Jens Olesen – grip assistant
 Henrik Thomsen – grip assistant
 Emil Sauer – sound mix assistant
 Jørgen Bo Behrensdorff – live sound recording

Additional crew
 Claus Christensen – still photographer
 Bo Thornvig – still photographer
 Andreas Molin Nielsen – still photographer
 Anja Wejs Phigalt – production manager
 Lars Moroh – production manager
 Henrik Seifert – management, booking
Live crew
 Mif Damgaard – head of production, tour manager
 Jens Qvistgaard – production manager
 Paul Hammann – FOH engineer
 Daniel Devantier – monitor engineer
 Theis Romme – sound technician
 Michael Madsen – sound technician
 Mads Birkebæk – sound technician
 Arild Nordgaard – guitar technician
 Rasmus Salskov – drum technician
 Kasper Lange – lighting designer
 Karsten Sørensen – lighting technician
 Balder Thorrud – lighting technician
 Jørgen Barfoed – head rigger

References 

2010 live albums
2010 video albums
Dizzy Mizz Lizzy albums
EMI Records live albums
Live video albums